Living It Up (French: À belles dents) is a 1966 French-West German drama film directed by Pierre Gaspard-Huit and starring Mireille Darc, Jacques Charrier and Daniel Gélin.

The film's sets were designed by the art director Willy Schatz. It was shot in Eastmancolor.

Cast
 Mireille Darc as Eva Ritter  
 Jacques Charrier as Jean-Loup Costa  
 Daniel Gélin as Bernard 
 Peter van Eyck as Peter von Kessner  
 Paul Hubschmid as Francesco Jimenez  
 Tilda Thamar as Stella  
 Erika Remberg as Marie  
 Ilse Steppat as Carol Stevens  
 Reinhold Timm as Jaro  
 Ingrid Steeger as Girl at fancy dress party  
 Maurice Garrel 
 Robert Le Béal 
 Ellen Bahl 
 Helga Lehner
 Henry Djanik 
 Christian Lude

References

Bibliography 
 Bock, Hans-Michael & Bergfelder, Tim. The Concise CineGraph. Encyclopedia of German Cinema. Berghahn Books, 2009.

External links 
 

1966 films
1966 drama films
German drama films
West German films
1960s French-language films
Films directed by Pierre Gaspard-Huit
French drama films
Films with screenplays by Jean-Loup Dabadie
1960s French films
1960s German films
French-language German films